Barhath (Devnagari: बारहठ; IAST: Bārahaṭha) (spelled variously as Barhat, Bareth) is an honorific title of the Charans. The title was given to prominent Charans who occupied significant positions in the royal courts in medieval India. It is used as a surname by Charans of Rohadia clan as well as other clans such as Sauda.

Etymology 
Barhath is derived from "Dvar-pati" or "Dvar-hath". It translates as 'Guardian of the Gate'.

History 
The title 'Barhath' is a synonym of the older term 'Prolpat' or 'Paulpat' which also means 'Guardian of the Gate'. They were described as 'the guardians of Rajput codes of conduct whose poetry and history defined valour, loyalty, and honour'. They oversaw the defense and safety of their Rajput rulers: under siege, they would be the first line of defense at the gate of the fort.Barhath, a title given to trusted Carans who, during times of siege, stood at the main gates (paul) of forts and were the first to fight and give their lives in its defense.

Notable people 

 Narharidas Barhath

 Thakur Kesari Singh Barhath
 Thakur Zorawar Singh Barhath
 Kunwar Pratap Singh Barhath

References 

Indian surnames
Surnames
Titles in India
Men's social titles
Cultural history of India
Linguistic history of India
Charan